Cayetano Domingo Grossi (1854 – April 6, 1900) was the first known serial killer in Argentinian history. He murdered five of his own neonatal children that were born as the result of his rape of his two stepdaughters. For this reason he was sentenced to death and executed by firing squad on April 6, 1900.

History 

On May 29, 1896, a bag containing the arm of a baby was found at a waste facility. The findings were reported to Police Station 12, where the head of police ordered an inspection of the place.  Leaving the place under surveillance, they found, among the trash,  a shattered skull, legs, and the other arm. It was concluded that all parts were from the same body. The autopsy revealed that baby died from a skull fracture, but the investigation did not yield any leads as to who the victim or the killer was, leaving the crime unsolved.

Two years later, on May 5, 1898, a  body of a newborn with a shattered skull in advanced state of decomposition was found. On his arms and neck were signs of first and second degree burns. According to the forensic tests, the baby did not die from the burns, it died from severe compression of the anterior part of the neck.

During the investigation, someone noticed that the body appeared to be wrapped up in burlap that is used often in repairs. It was established that a car had collected the garbage and human remains.

Interviewing a man named Carretero, he confessed that he had seen the remains, but of fear of being considered involved, had decided to say nothing to police.

Thoroughly reviewing the collected items, the researches noticed that the bag had numerous patches, had a remarkable wear on the trellises, as if it had been used by a peddler carrying baskets with straps and that in his pockets were remains of cigarettes and anise grains, which made the authorities consider that the perpetrator was either Spanish or Calabrian, since they had a habit of carrying anise seeds. The other garments, by their quality and condition, showed that their owner was poor.

Thus, the police started staking out the garbage cart and directing the search towards people with scarce resources; they were able to locate and take cognizance on May 9, 1898, that on Artes Street 1438 (now Carlos Pellegrini) in the Retiro neighbourhood of Buenos Aires, there was a family that always dressed in the morning.

The aforementioned family consisted of a woman named Rose Ponce de Nicola, her spouse, Cayetano Domingo Grossi (a carter by profession); Rosa's two older daughters Clara and Catalina, and three younger children.

The police learned from neighbours' testimonies that Grossi had intimate relationships with his stepdaughters. It was also established that Clara had been pregnant a short time before, and a few days later, she was in a normal state, not knowing what happened to her baby.

A day later, on May 10, a police commission ordered an inspection of a room occupied by the family, which revealed a tin containing the body of an infant wrapped in rags, thus confirming their suspicions. Grossi explained that the sack was found in a garbage bin belonging to his son Carlos, and that he had killed the baby at Clara's request. He also said that the other baby had been born dead.

That night, Rosa and her daughter Clara declared that the latter had two children with Grossi. He initially denied having sex with his stepdaughters, blaming their boyfriends for their pregnancies. Finally, a few days later, he confessed to murdering the first found baby in 1896; at the same time he confessed to incinerating several more babies, but without assuming they had died.

In subsequent interrogations, Grossi acknowledged having one child with Catalina and four with Clara, strangling three, the remaining two being burned by his stepdaughters. Rosa, Clara and Catalina accepted the five crimes but blamed Grossi for the deaths of the newborns.

The strange degree of submission of the women to the criminal which had led them to be so silent for so long caught the police's attention. It was alleged that on one occasion Grossi tried to rape one of Rosa's younger daughters but the sisters prevented it. Finally, it was established that Grossi himself helped with the births and then threw the babies into fires, which was witnessed by the women.

Death sentence and execution 
Grossi's wife Rosa and her daughters, Clara and Catalina, were considered "concealers" of the homicides and were sentenced to three years of effective prison each and to pay court costs. Ultimately, Catalina's sentence was reduced to two years in prison.

Having established the responsibilities of the accused, Cayetano Domingo Grossi was found guilty as the perpetrator of the murders and was sentenced to death by Judge Ernesto Madero.

On the day of his execution, at 5 o'clock in the morning, Grossi's children entered the prison chapel, the first of which being his 19-year-old son. While he hadn't seen his father in over a year, he showed no emotion in this final visit. The youngest son, Lorenzo, 6 years old, did not want to approach his father and shied away from his caresses. Teresita, his daughter, cried when she saw him, and also resisted hugging him.

First lieutenants Rosa Burgos and Calisto García, and captain Manuel Medrano, were in charge of Grossi's execution. For this he was blindfolded, put on the bench with his hands and feet tied, and had his sentence carried out by firing squad on April 6, 1900 at 8 AM. After the initial volly, second lieutenant Emilio Lascano approached the body and shot him in a coup de grâce.

Grossi is the first serial killer in Argentinian history, although there is a common misconception that  Cayetano Santos Godino holds the title.

See also 

 Death penalty
 List of serial killers by country

References 

1854 births
1900 deaths
Argentine murderers of children
Argentine rapists
Executed Argentine serial killers
Filicides
Italian emigrants to Argentina
Male serial killers
People executed by Argentina by firing squad
People executed for murder
People from Calabria